Joseph Heckel (7 July 1922 – 29 May 2011) was a French footballer. He competed in the men's tournament at the 1948 Summer Olympics.

References

External links

1922 births
2011 deaths
French footballers
Olympic footballers of France
Footballers at the 1948 Summer Olympics
Sportspeople from Bas-Rhin
Association football forwards
Footballers from Alsace
RC Strasbourg Alsace players